Lemieux is a French surname originating from Normandy and it has been traced from Rouen in the 1600s to earlier origins on the Cotentin peninsula. According to the website "Les familles Lemieux d'Amerique" ("The Lemieux families of America") the North American Lemieux are descended from two half-brothers, Pierre and Gabriel, who emigrated from Rouen, France, to Quebec in 1643. This surname is not to be confused with Lémieux, a name of French origin which is derived from a small town, Leymieux, in the Rhône-Alpes region of France.

It may refer to the following people:

In sports
 Mario Lemieux (born 1965), Canadian ice hockey player
 Alain Lemieux (born 1961), Canadian ice hockey player, brother of Mario
 Brendan Lemieux (born 1996), American-Canadian ice hockey player, son of Claude
 Claude Lemieux (born 1965), Canadian ice hockey player, brother of Jocelyn
 David Lemieux (boxer) (born 1988), Canadian boxer
 Jacques Lemieux (born 1943), Canadian ice hockey player
 Jean Lemieux (born 1952), Canadian ice hockey player
 Jocelyn Lemieux (born 1967), Canadian ice hockey player, brother of Claude
 Lawrence Lemieux (born 1955), Canadian sailor
 Réal Lemieux (1945–1975), Canadian ice hockey player
 Richard Lemieux (born 1951), Canadian ice hockey player
 Shane Lemieux (born 1997), American football player

In politics
 Diane Lemieux (born 1961), Canadian politician
 Francois-Xavier Lemieux (1811–1864), Québec lawyer and politician; uncle of Francois-Xavier
 François-Xavier Lemieux (Quebec MNA) (1851–1933), Québec lawyer of Louis Riel, politician, and judge; nephew of Francois-Xavier
 George LeMieux (born 1969), US Senator from Florida
 Pierre Lemieux (born 1963), Canadian politician
 Rodolphe Lemieux (1866–1937), Canadian journalist, lawyer, professor, and politician
 Ron Lemieux (born 1950), Canadian politician

In other fields
 David Lemieux (born 1970), Canadian Legacy Manager and Audio Archivist for the Grateful Dead
 Diana Lemieux (born ?), American photographer
 Jean-Michel Lemieux, chief technology officer of Shopify
 Jean Paul Lemieux (1904–1990), Canadian painter
 Julie Lemieux (born 1962), Canadian voice actress and director
 Kelly LeMieux (born 1967), bass player with the band Goldfinger
 Lyse Lemieux (judge) (born 1936), Chief Justice of the Quebec Superior Court
 Marie-Nicole Lemieux (born 1975), Canadian contralto
 Raymond Lemieux (1920–2000), Canadian biochemist, discoverer of the synthesis of sucrose
 Thomas Lemieux, Canadian economist
 Victoria Lemieux (born 1963), Canadian specialist in records management and Associate Professor of Archival Studies

See also
 Lemieux (disambiguation)

References